The 1974 Westminster Council election took place on 2 May 1974 to elect members of Westminster City Council in London, England. The whole council was up for election and the Conservative party stayed in overall control of the council.

Background

Election result

Ward results

References

Election, 2010
1974 London Borough council elections
May 1974 events in the United Kingdom